The Tear That Burned is a 1914 American short drama film directed by Jack O'Brien.

Cast
 Josephine Crowell
 John T. Dillon (as John Dillon)
 Mae Gaston
 Lillian Gish
 William Lowery (as William C. Lowery)
 Blanche Sweet

See also
 Lillian Gish filmography
 Blanche Sweet filmography

References

External links

1914 films
American silent short films
1914 drama films
American black-and-white films
1914 short films
Silent American drama films
1910s American films